North Granby is a village and census-designated place (CDP) in Hartford County, Connecticut, United States. It is part of the town of Granby. The population was 1,944 at the 2010 census.

The center of North Granby is today marked principally by the Cossitt Branch Library and the Allen Cider Mill.

Geography

Demographics
As of the census of 2000, there were 1,720 people, 568 households, and 500 families residing in the CDP. The racial makeup of the CDP was 96.86% White, 0.58% African American, 0.23% Native American, 0.93% Asian, 0.47% from other races, and 0.93% from two or more races. Hispanic or Latino of any race were 1.69% of the population.

There were 568 households, out of which 47.2% had children under the age of 18 living with them, 81.3% were married couples living together, 4.8% had a female householder with no husband present, and 11.8% were non-families. 7.9% of all households were made up of individuals, and 2.8% had someone living alone who was 65 years of age or older.  The average household size was 3.03 and the average family size was 3.22.

In the CDP the population was spread out, with 30.8% under the age of 18, 4.1% from 18 to 24, 28.1% from 25 to 44, 32.2% from 45 to 64, and 4.8% who were 65 years of age or older.  The median age was 39 years. For every 100 females, there were 106.5 males.  For every 100 females age 18 and over, there were 100.0 males.

In 2000 the median income for a household in the CDP was $101,103, and the median income for a family was $103,133. Males had a median income of $69,028 versus $39,922 for females. The per capita income for the CDP was $34,459.  About 1.6% of families and 3.7% of the population were below the poverty line, including 1.9% of those under age 18 and none of those age 65 or over.

The 2008 estimated median household income was $127,851 with the per capita income at $44,078. The 2008 estimated median house value was appraised at $447,917. The mean sale price of all houses in 2008 was $455,555.

References

External links
Cossitt Library

Census-designated places in Hartford County, Connecticut
Villages in Connecticut
Granby, Connecticut